The following is a list of the winners of the Engine Manufacturer Championship award in Open Wheel American Championship Car Racing. This award was first introduced during the 1979 CART Indy Car Series season.

The Engine Manufacturer Cup winners came under the following auspices:

Championship Auto Racing Teams   (1979-2007)
Indy Racing League/IndyCar Series (1997–present)

Winners

IndyCar Series Engine Manufacturer Championship

References

 http://media.indycar.com/pdf/2011/IICS_2011_Historical_Record_Book_INT6.pdf

Engine Manufacturer